Closer to Grey is the seventh and final studio album by American electronic music band Chromatics, released through Italians Do It Better without prior announcement on October 2, 2019. It is their first album in seven years, and follows the continuing delay of Dear Tommy, originally teased in 2014. On March 31, 2020, the band released a companion album titled Faded Now   which included remixes from Closer to Grey, as well as covers and new material. All the tracks that compose this double feature are included in the Deluxe Edition of Closer to Grey, as well as instrumental and a cappella versions of some songs.

Background
The title track, "Closer to Grey", was released in 2014 through Johnny Jewel's SoundCloud. The first track, "The Sound of Silence", is a cover of the Simon & Garfunkel song. The tenth track, "On the Wall", is a cover of The Jesus and Mary Chain song. The cover of the record represents Closer to Grey as the seventh Chromatics album, turning Dear Tommy (the would-be sixth unreleased album) into a "lost" record.

Track listing

Critical reception

Year-end rankings

References

2019 albums
Chromatics (band) albums